Ministry of Human Rights (Arabic:  وزارة حقوق الإنسان ) is a cabinet ministry of Yemen.

List of ministers 

 Ahmed Omar Arman (18 December 2020–present)
 Azzadin al-Asbahi (7 November 2014 – 2020)
 Hooria Mashhour (2012–2014)
 Huda al-Baan (April 2007–20 March 2011)

See also 
 Politics of Yemen

References 

Government ministries of Yemen
Human rights ministries